Hombre, the Spanish word for "man" and sometimes used informally in English, may refer to:

 Hombre (novel), a 1961 novel by Elmore Leonard
 Hombre (film), a 1967 motion picture based on the novel starring Paul Newman, directed by Martin Ritt
 Hombre (comics), a Spanish comics series by Antonio Segura and José Ortiz
 Hombre (magazine), a magazine for Latino men
 L'Hombre (or, in 17th Century Spanish orthography, Ombre), a card game of Spanish origin
 "Hombre", a 2005 song by M.I.A from her debut album Arular
 Amiga Hombre chipset for Commodore-Amiga computers
 Isuzu Hombre, a pickup truck sold in the U.S. from 1996 to 2000

See also
 Hombres, the plural of Hombre
 Ombre, a seventeenth-century trick-taking card game
 Ombré, the gradual blending of one color hue to another